The Second Book of Nephi, usually referred to as Second Nephi or 2 Nephi, is the second book of the Book of Mormon. The original translation of the title did not include the word "second". First and Second were added to the titles of The Books of Nephi by Oliver Cowdery when preparing the book for printing. According to the book, it was written by the ancient prophet Nephi, son of Lehi, who lived around 600 BC. Originally 15 chapters in length, the book was reformatted in 1879 by Orson Pratt to its current length of thirty three chapters long.

Unlike First Nephi, this book contains little history of the Nephite people but instead discusses visions and prophecies of Nephi himself and other ancient prophets, such as Isaiah.

Narrative

Lehi's last counsel
Second Nephi begins with the prophecies of Lehi concerning the future of his seed, and speaks to his posterity. As Lehi is old and will soon die, he wishes to bestow blessings upon his children.  
Lehi relates a vision whereby he knew that Jerusalem was destroyed, and he says that had they remained in the city they would have perished. He emphasizes that if the people are righteous, they will prosper; but if they are wicked, they will be destroyed. This is a general blessing and curse upon all peoples who inhabit the land where Lehi and his family lived.

In 2 Nephi chapter 2, Lehi expounds to Jacob about the redemption and salvation through Jesus. He speaks about opposites—that without evil there is no good; without sin there is no righteousness; that without these things there is no God; and if there is no God there is no earth. He talks about the importance of The Fall of Man and how without it, man would lose his free will, and salvation would ultimately be impossible.

To Joseph, he talks about his namesake, which includes Joseph of Egypt. He quotes some of the lost prophecies by Joseph. Joseph predicted that the Lord would raise up Moses to free the people of Israel. He also predicted that a seer named after Joseph, and whose father's name is also Joseph, would the Lord raise up, for the purpose of restoring Israel.

On 2 Nephi verses 23 and 24 mentions that the descendants of Joseph (Lehi's son) would not be destroyed "for they shall hearken unto the words of the book" (this books seems to be The Book of Mormon). Then on verse 24, most likely referring to his posterity it says "there shall rise up one mighty among them, who shall do much good, both in word and deed (...)". While the references suggest he is Joseph Smith, this seems contradictory as he is not a descendant of Lehi. Therefore, it is not clear who this person may be.

Lehi blesses Zoram, the servant of Laban who had thrown in his lot with Nephi, as long as he and his seed obey the commandments of the Lord. To the children of his sons Laman and Lemuel he says that if their parents teach them wickedness, that their sins will be the responsibility of the parents.

Division of the people
Nephi continues the narrative by recording the death of Lehi. In this passage, he also records what is known as "the Psalm of Nephi", where he pleads for the Lord to forgive his weaknesses, make him strong so he can conquer his enemies, and redeem his soul.

After the death of Lehi, Laman and Lemuel and others rebel against Nephi and try to kill him. Warned by the Lord, Nephi leaves the area with those who listen to him and travel far away to establish another settlement. He takes the brass plates and other records, along with the ball or compass. They call this new place Nephi, choose Nephi to be their king, and call themselves the people of Nephi, or Nephites. They observe the Law of Moses as it is recorded in the brass plates. They also prosper exceedingly, and build a temple like the temple of Solomon.

Nephi also begins arming his people using the sword that Laban had as a model for production. At this time, the people with Laman and Lemuel and others who remained behind had their skin turn dark, as a sign that the people of Nephi are not to mix with them until they repent.

Jacob preaches
Nephi ordains his younger brothers Jacob and Joseph as teachers over the people of Nephi. The remainder of Second Nephi is a recording of their (Jacob's and Nephi's) teachings and prophecies.

A speech that Jacob delivered to the people of Nephi is recorded in chapters 6-10. Jacob quotes passages from Isaiah. He prophesies that the destruction of the people in Jerusalem has already happened. He also shows that at a future date the Lord will lift up his hand to the Gentiles, and set up his standard, and then gather the tribes of Israel one final time. He reads from Isaiah 50 and 51. Then he prophesies about the birth, life, infinite atonement and death of Christ, calling on his people to repent and believe in the Savior. He also explains the resurrection; that the body lies in the grave and the spirit either in torment or in a state of paradise, and that without Christ there could be no resurrection, and that because of Christ all men will be resurrected with their spirit being freed from either paradise or torment and their body raised from the grave, and then they are judged according to their works in life.  Jacob continues by teaching about the various sins, such as lying, murdering, whoredoms, idol worship. He exhorts his people to throw off their sins. He then continues by prophesying about the crucifixion of Jesus Christ and the establishment of a free people in America in the last days.

Nephi quotes Isaiah, gives final counsel
Nephi then records in the book  more of Isaiah— chapters 2 through 14 of Isaiah. Nephi then prophesies that Christ himself will visit the Nephites in America after his death and resurrection. He prophesies the destruction of his own people due to wickedness. He also predicts that the remainder of the people, the Lamanites and others, will be smitten by the immigrating Gentiles in the last days. He prophesies that the Gentiles will establish many different churches and also practice priestcraft, or the practice of preaching the gospel for money rather than for the love of the gospel. Nephi predicts the translation of the Book of Mormon and of the Three Witnesses who would testify that it was true. He prophesies the conversation that Martin Harris has with Professor Charles Anthon. Nephi continues by prophesying about the Gentiles' attitude towards the Bible, who would accept it as the only scripture in the world. Nephi challenges that assumption, and encourages the Gentiles to believe that God would speak to more than one nation. He also says that there will be scriptures that will come from some of the lost tribes of Israel. The House of Israel is described as having three parts, and Nephi prophesies that one day all their writings would be restored and made known one to the other.

"And it shall come to pass that the Jews shall have the words of the Nephites, and the Nephites shall have the words of the Jews; and the Nephites and the Jews shall have the words of the lost tribes of Israel; and the lost tribes of Israel shall have the words of the Nephites and the Jews."

Nephi ends his record by pleading with the reader to follow the Savior's example and be baptized, but emphasizes that baptism is the beginning of the way and not the end, underscoring the need to enduring to the end. His final words include another exhortation to pray and seek the Holy Ghost, and a testimony that his words are true.

See also

 The Book of Mormon Movie, Vol. 1: The Journey
 Nephi, son of Lehi

Notes

Further reading

.

External links

 The Second Book of Nephi from the official website of The Church of Jesus Christ of Latter-Day Saints

Nephi2